Lingfield Christian Academy is an independent, boarding and day school for boys and girls in Gweru, Zimbabwe.

Academics
Lingfield Christian Academy offers programs developed and examined by Cambridge International Examinations, such as the Cambridge IGCSE and Cambridge International AS/A Level. The school also offers ZIMSEC qualifications.

Activities
Lingfield has the following sports on offer: archery, athletics, basketball, cricket, English riding (horse riding), football, fishing, golf, hockey, polo crosse, rugby, swimming, tennis and volleyball.

The following clubs and societies are on offer at Lingfield: 
Community Service, Debating Society, Equestrian Club, Scripture Union, Student Government and Student Newspaper.

See also
 List of schools in Zimbabwe
 List of boarding schools

References

External links
  Official website

High schools in Zimbabwe
Private schools in Zimbabwe
Co-educational schools in Zimbabwe
Boarding schools in Zimbabwe
Day schools in Zimbabwe
Cambridge schools in Zimbabwe
Educational institutions established in 2016
2016 establishments in Zimbabwe